Dixmoor (formerly Specialville) is a village in Cook County, Illinois, United States and a south suburb of Chicago. The population was 2,973 at the 2020 census.

Dixmoor is adjacent to Harvey to the south & east, Posen to the west, and Blue Island & Riverdale to the north.  Interstate 57 also runs through the village.

History

Dixmoor was originally called Specialville. It was laid out in 1922 by Charles Special, and named for him. The present name of Dixmoor was adopted in 1929. It may be derived from Dixie Highway.

Geography
Dixmoor is located at  (41.630784, -87.666446).

Surrounding areas
 Blue Island 
 Blue Island     Riverdale 
 Posen    Riverdale 
 Posen / Harvey    Harvey
 Harvey

Demographics
As of the 2020 census there were 2,973 people, 1,209 households, and 838 families residing in the village. The racial makeup of the village was 15.47% White, 50.92% African American, 1.58% Native American, 0.61% Asian, 0.07% Pacific Islander, 18.67% from other races, and 12.68% from two or more races. Hispanic or Latino of any race were 36.66% of the population.

There were 1,209 households, out of which 49.79% had children under the age of 18 living with them, 38.63% were married couples living together, 22.42% had a female householder with no husband present, and 30.69% were non-families. 29.36% of all households were made up of individuals, and 4.96% had someone living alone who was 65 years of age or older. The average household size was 3.72 and the average family size was 2.95.

The village's age distribution consisted of 26.7% under the age of 18, 10.4% from 18 to 24, 32.2% from 25 to 44, 20.3% from 45 to 64, and 10.4% who were 65 years of age or older. The median age was 29.9 years. For every 100 females, there were 85.7 males. For every 100 females age 18 and over, there were 86.9 males.

The median income for a household in the village was $44,757, and the median income for a family was $44,375. Males had a median income of $26,736 versus $15,552 for females. The per capita income for the village was $16,349. About 27.4% of families and 26.9% of the population were below the poverty line, including 40.5% of those under age 18 and 22.6% of those age 65 or over.

Note: the US Census treats Hispanic/Latino as an ethnic category. This table excludes Latinos from the racial categories and assigns them to a separate category. Hispanics/Latinos can be of any race.

Government
Dixmoor is divided between two congressional districts. The area east of Interstate 57 and south of 142nd Street is in Illinois's 2nd congressional district, as are the area between 141st and 142nd Streets east of Wood Street and the area northeast of the Ashland Avenue-Thornton Road intersection; the rest of the village is in the 1st district.

Notable people

 Tony Jacobs, pitcher for the Chicago Cubs and St. Louis Cardinals.
 Napoleon Harris, American politician and former American football linebacker who has been a member of the Illinois Senate representing the 15th district since 2013.

References

External links
Village of Dixmoor official website

Villages in Illinois
Chicago metropolitan area
Villages in Cook County, Illinois
Populated places established in 1923
1923 establishments in Illinois
Majority-minority cities and towns in Cook County, Illinois